Aaron L. Mackler is Associate Professor of Theology at Duquesne University in Pittsburgh, Pennsylvania and an ordained Conservative Rabbi.  He is an author in the fields of bioethics and Jewish law. He was editor of Life and Death Responsibilities in Jewish Biomedical Ethics and authored Introduction to Jewish and Catholic Bioethics, part of the Georgetown Press Moral Traditions series.

Mackler served on the Committee on Jewish Law and Standards of the Conservative movement as the Medical Ethics Subcommittee Chair, and has written and edited numerous responsa. Mackler's work has been cited for the New York State Task Force. He wrote a book published under Georgetown University press entitled "An Introduction to Jewish and Catholic Bioethics: A Comparative Analysis."

Education

Mackler received his B.A. from Yale University in Religious Studies and Biochemistry in 1980. At the Hebrew University, Jerusalem, Israel he pursued Graduate Studies in Jewish philosophy, Bible, and Midrash.  From the Jewish Theological Seminary of America, New York, NY in 1985 he received and M.A. and Rabbinic ordination.  In 1992, he was awarded a Ph.D. in Philosophy from Georgetown University, Washington, DC.  Mackler's dissertation was entitled "Cases and Judgments in Ethical Reasoning: An Appraisal of Contemporary Casuistry and Holistic Model for the Mutual Support of Norms and Case Judgments”.

Publications 
Responsa 1991-2000: The Committee on Jewish Law and Standards, 2001, The Rabbinical Assembly
Life & Death Responsibilities in Jewish Biomedical Ethics, Aaron L. Mackler, JTS, 2000

References

External links 
 Faculty webpage at Duquesne University

American Conservative rabbis
Religious leaders from Pittsburgh
Living people
Yale University alumni
Georgetown University alumni
Jewish Theological Seminary of America semikhah recipients
Jewish medical ethics
Duquesne University faculty
Rabbis from Pennsylvania
Year of birth missing (living people)
Jewish ethicists
20th-century American rabbis
21st-century American rabbis